Nicolò Barella  (born 7 February 1997) is an Italian professional footballer who plays as a midfielder for  club Inter Milan and the Italy national team. He is often recognized as one of the best midfielders in Europe.

Club career

Cagliari 
Born in Cagliari, Barella is a youth exponent from Cagliari Calcio. He made his Serie A debut on 4 May 2015 against Parma, replacing Diego Farias after 68 minutes in a 4–0 home win.

In January 2016, he was sent on loan to Como in Serie B, where he played as a first choice for the second part of the season.

On 17 September 2017, he scored his first professional and Serie A goal against SPAL in a 2–0 home win.

Inter Milan 
On 12 July 2019, Barella joined Inter Milan on a year-long loan deal with an obligation to buy with four-year contract to take effect after the loan period. He made his club debut on 26 August against Lecce; he came off the bench in the second half for Matías Vecino, and later helped set-up Antonio Candreva's goal in an eventual 4–0 home win in Inter's opening match of the 2019–20 Serie A season. He made his Champions League debut on 17 September against Slavia Prague; after coming off the bench for Marcelo Brozović in the second half, he scored an injury-time equalising goal to help Inter to a 1–1 home draw, which was his first goal both in the competition and for Inter. On 9 November, he scored his first league goal for the club as Inter came from behind to achieve a 2–1 home win over Verona. He scored his first goal in the Coppa Italia on 29 January 2020, in 2–1 home win over Fiorentina, in the quarter-finals of the tournament.

On 17 January 2021, Barella assisted for the first goal for Arturo Vidal and scored a vital second in a 2–0 home win against rivals and defending champions Juventus in Serie A. At the end of the 2020–21 Serie A season, he won the Scudetto and was elected Best Midfielder by Lega Serie A as well as included (for the third edition in a row) in the 2020–21 Serie A Team of the Year.

On 5 November 2021, Barella signed a contract extension with Inter, keeping him at the club until 2026. At the end of the 2021–22 season, after having won the Coppa Italia and the Supercoppa Italiana, Barella (and his teammate Hakan Çalhanoğlu) totalled 12 assists, which is the highest number for an Inter player since Opta Sports started collecting such data in 2004–05. At the end of the season, he was included in the 2021–22 Serie A Team of the Year for the fourth year in a row.

International career 
With the Italy U19 team, Barella took part at the 2016 UEFA European Under-19 Championship, finishing in second place.

With the Italy U20 he took part at the 2017 FIFA U-20 World Cup, finishing in third place.

Barella made his debut with the Italy U21 team on 1 September 2017, in a 3–0 friendly defeat against Spain.

Barella was called up to the senior Italy squad by manager Gian Piero Ventura for the team's 2018 World Cup qualifiers against Macedonia and Albania in October 2017.

Barella made his debut for the Italy senior side on 10 October 2018, under manager Roberto Mancini, in a 1–1 friendly draw against Ukraine in Genoa. On 23 March 2019, Barella scored his first goal for Italy in a 2–0 home win over Finland in a UEFA Euro 2020 qualifying match.

He took part with the U21 side in the 2019 UEFA European Under-21 Championship.

In June 2021, he was included in Italy's squad for UEFA Euro 2020. In Italy's second group match on 16 June, he set up Manuel Locatelli second goal in an eventual 3–0 win over Switzerland, which allowed Italy to advance to the round of 16. On 2 July, he scored Italy's opening goal of the match, and later assisted Lorenzo Insigne's goal, in a 2–1 win over Belgium in the quarter-finals of the competition. On 11 July, Barella won the European Championship with Italy following a 3–2 penalty shoot-out victory over England at Wembley Stadium in the final, after a 1–1 draw in extra-time; Barella started the match, but was substituted by Bryan Cristante in the second half of regulation time.

On 10 October, Barella scored the opening goal in a 2–1 home win over Belgium in the bronze medal match of the 2020–21 UEFA Nations League.

Style of play 
Barella is considered a talented midfielder in the European sports media. He was named the best young Italian player born in 1997 for two consecutive years between 2012 and 2013. Italian football journalist Mina Rzouki described him as an intelligent, promising, and composed midfielder, despite his young age, with a wide range of skills. She also commented that Barella "...can dribble through a defence, score volleys and start counter-attacks. He knows how to find the right passes and is box-to-box. Most importantly he can win back possession quickly and recover the ball." Barella's performances have also been praised by Italian former footballers Andrea Pirlo and Alessandro Del Piero. The Italian sports newspaper La Gazzetta dello Sport has compared him to Steven Gerrard, describing him as a dynamic player with good technique, vision, stamina, and physical strength, despite his relatively short stature, as well as an ability to win balls, which enables him to break down possession and subsequently start quick attacking plays. A versatile player, he is capable of playing anywhere in midfield, and has even been used as an attacking midfielder or as a defensive midfielder, but his favoured role is as a right-sided, offensive-minded central midfielder, known as a "mezzala" in Italy. Known for his eye for goal, he possesses a good shot from outside the area, and is known for his ability to make late attacking runs from behind into the penalty area. He is also an accurate set piece and penalty taker. He is known for his strong character, leadership qualities, competitive spirit, and winning mentality, but has also drawn criticism at times in the press for protesting or arguing excessively with officials during matches. His Italy teammate Jorginho has likened him to N'Golo Kanté.

Career statistics

Club

International 

Scores and results list Italy's goal tally first, score column indicates score after each Barella goal.

Honours
Inter Milan
Serie A: 2020–21
 Coppa Italia: 2021–22
 Supercoppa Italiana: 2021, 2022
UEFA Europa League runner-up: 2019–20

Italy U19
UEFA European Under-19 Championship runner-up: 2016

Italy U20
FIFA U-20 World Cup third place: 2017

Italy
UEFA European Championship: 2020
UEFA Nations League third place: 2020–21

Individual
Ballon d'Or nominee: 2021
Premio Bulgarelli Number 8: 2019
Serie A Team of the Year (4): 2018–19, 2019–20, 2020–21, 2021–22
UEFA Europa League Squad of the Season: 2019–20
Serie A Best Midfielder: 2020–21
Gazzetta Sports Awards Exploit of the Year: 2021
Giuseppe Prisco Award: 2022

Orders
 5th Class / Knight: Cavaliere Ordine al Merito della Repubblica Italiana: 2021

References

External links 

 Profile at the Inter Milan website
 Profile at LegaSerieA 
 Profile at FIGC 

1997 births
Living people
Sportspeople from Cagliari
Footballers from Sardinia
Italian footballers
Italy youth international footballers
Italy under-21 international footballers
Italy international footballers
Association football midfielders
Cagliari Calcio players
Como 1907 players
Inter Milan players
Serie A players
Serie B players
UEFA Euro 2020 players
UEFA European Championship-winning players
Knights of the Order of Merit of the Italian Republic